Claudio Biern Boyd (21 November 1940 – 17 October 2022) was a Spanish television writer, director, producer and founder of the Spanish animation studio BRB Internacional. He created the television shows The World of David the Gnome and Gladiator Academy, among other projects.

Life and career
Throughout his professional career, Boyd received more than forty awards, among which are the Extraordinary Talent Award of the Academia de Televisión in 2017, Best Communicator with Children Award of the Festival Internacional de Comunicación Infantil El Chupete in 2014, Biznaga de Oro 2012 awarded by the Málaga Film Festival in 2012, Medalla al Trabajo President Macià Generalitat de Catalunya in 2011, the European Tribute of Honor award given by Cartoon Forum in 2007 or the Bronze Medal of the New York International Film and Television Festival for the series Dogtanian and the Three Muskehounds in 1982.

Boyd later chaired his companies, BRB Internacional and Apolo Films. He also ran as a candidate for the presidency of the football club RCD Espanyol, although he did not obtain the necessary votes to win.

Boyd died on 17 October 2022, at the age of 81.

Filmography
TV shows
A Thousand and One... Americas
Around the World with Willy Fog
Willy Fog 2
Dogtanian and the Three Muskehounds
The Return of Dogtanian
The Mozart Band
Football Stories
Fantaghirò
The Gnomes' Great Adventure
The World of David the Gnome
Wisdom of the Gnomes
Ruy, the Little Cid
Vicky & Johnny
The Untouchables of Elliot Mouse
Yolanda:The Secret of the Black Rose
Gladiator Academy

Films
The Monstrous Adventures of Zipi and Zape
The Princess and the Pirate: Sandokan the TV Movie
Fantaghiro: Quest for the Quorum

References

External links
 

1940 births
2022 deaths
People from Palma de Mallorca
Spanish animators
Spanish film directors
Spanish film producers
Spanish television producers
Spanish animated film directors
Spanish animated film producers